Sefid Savar (also Romanized as Sefīd Savār) is a village in Jeygaran Rural District, Ozgoleh District, Salas-e Babajani County, Kermanshah Province, Iran. At the 2006 census, its population was 67, in 10 families.

References 

Populated places in Salas-e Babajani County